Sage-Allen was a mid-market department store chain based in Hartford, Connecticut.  The store was a fixture in southern New England and anchored a number of smaller local and regional shopping centers in Connecticut, Massachusetts and, later, New Hampshire, until it ceased operation in 1994.

History 
Known for its apparel, home goods, accessories and children's wear, the downtown Hartford flagship store was considered a smaller but respected rival to the larger and dominant G. Fox & Co. store a block away.  Sage-Allen participated in the wave of post-World War II suburban expansion much earlier than G. Fox and first opened in a number of smaller village center locales prior to the more modern shopping centers and mall locations it would later occupy.  

The company began a slow decline in the mid to late 1980s which was accelerated by the severe economic recession that hit the region in the early 1990s. In a move to bolster the retailer's profitability, a merger was formed with another small regional department store chain, Addis & Dey's, located in Syracuse, New York. In spite of efforts by Sage-Dey, as the merged company was called, to strengthen its economic base, it filed for Chapter 11 in 1992 and ceased operations in 1994.

Sage-Allen Building
The Sage-Allen flagship store building in downtown Hartford, built in 1898, has been restored and now contains both retail space and luxury apartments. The store was known for the free-standing 'Sage-Allen' clock, a local landmark, that was located on the Main Street sidewalk in front of the store until the clock was damaged in a windstorm in 1992. The clock was later repaired and erected on another sidewalk in the city. Its importance as a Main Street landmark was known to the re-developers of the Sage-Allen building, and a deal was struck to return the clock to its traditional place. A clock specialist was called upon to restart the clock after its return to Main Street in the summer of 2007.

References

Defunct department stores based in Connecticut
Companies based in Hartford, Connecticut
Companies that filed for Chapter 11 bankruptcy in 1992